Bobby Wilson may refer to:

Bobby Wilson (actor), artist and writer, member of the sketch comedy troupe, the 1491s
Bobby Wilson (tennis) (1935–2020), British tennis player of the 1950s and 1960s
Bobby Wilson (Australian rules footballer) (1934–2003), Australian rules footballer for Fitzroy
Bobby Wilson (footballer, born 1943), Scottish footballer (Dundee FC)
Bobby Wilson (footballer, born 1944), English footballer
Bobby Wilson (Hibernian footballer), American soccer player
Bobby Wilson (basketball, born 1944), American professional basketball player in the ABA
Bobby Wilson (basketball, born 1951), American professional basketball player in the NBA
Bobby Wilson (defensive tackle) (born 1968), American football player
Bobby Wilson (racing driver) (born 1981), American racecar driver
Bobby Wilson (baseball) (born 1983), American baseball player
Bobby Wilson (Arizona politician) (born 1944)
Bobby Wilson (mathematician), American mathematician
Robert Tudawali (1929–1967), Indigenous Australian actor and activist, also known as Bobby Wilson

See also
 Robert Wilson (disambiguation)
 Bob Wilson (disambiguation)